Robert Thatcher (born 23 August 1974) is a British rower. He competed in the men's double sculls event at the 1996 Summer Olympics.

References

External links
 

1974 births
Living people
British male rowers
Olympic rowers of Great Britain
Rowers at the 1996 Summer Olympics
Rowers from Greater London